= Jen Aitken =

Canadian artist

- Born: 1985 (age 40–41); Edmonton, Alberta, Canada
- Known for: Sculptures and drawings
- Awards: Toronto Friends of the Visual Arts Award, 2021, Hnatyshyn Foundation and TD Bank Emerging Visual Artist Award, 2017, RBC Emerging Artist in Residence at the McMichael Canadian Art Collection, 2022
- Website: https://www.jenaitken.com/

Jen Aitken (1985 - ) is a Canadian artist, born in Edmonton, Alberta.

== Biography ==
Born in 1985 in western Canada, Aitken now lives and works in Toronto, Ontario. "She completed her MFA in 2014 at the University of Guelph, Ontario, and her BFA in 2010 at Emily Carr University, Vancouver."

Aitken creates floor-based sculptures and 2- and 3-dimensional drawings using a variety of materials, including paper, foam, concrete, wood, fiberglass, and stop-motion animation 3-channel video.
